The following low-power television stations broadcast on digital or analog channel 29 in the United States:

 K24II-D in Kanab, Utah
 K29AZ-D in Newport, Oregon
 K29BM-D in Montpelier, Idaho
 K29BN-D in Silver Springs, etc., Nevada
 K29CK-D in Carbondale, Colorado
 K29EB-D in Grand Rapids, Minnesota
 K29ED-D in Everett, Washington
 K29EG-D in Milton, etc., Oregon
 K29EL-D in La Grande, Oregon
 K29EM-D in Manti & Ephraim, Utah
 K29ES-D in Carson City, Nevada
 K29EV-D in Valmy, Nevada
 K29EY-D in Preston, Idaho
 K29FA-D in Beryl/Modena, etc., Utah
 K29FD-D in Lake Havasu City, Arizona
 K29FM-D in Artesia, New Mexico
 K29FR-D in Quanah, Texas
 K29FS-D in Wolf Point, Montana
 K29FY-D in Henefer/Echo, Utah
 K29GI-D in Holyoke, Colorado
 K29GJ-D in Tropic & Cannonville, Utah
 K29GK-D in Twentynine Palms, etc, California
 K29GO-D in Cortez, etc., Colorado
 K29GV-D in Hagerman, Idaho
 K29HB-D in Clovis, New Mexico
 K29HD-D in Idalia, Colorado
 K29HG-D in Jackson, Wyoming
 K29HL-D in Hanalei, etc., Hawaii
 K29HM-D in Lake George, Colorado
 K29HN-D in Escalante, Utah
 K29HR-D in Farmington, New Mexico
 K29HV-D in La Barge, etc., Wyoming
 K29HW-D in Austin, Texas
 K29HX-D in Wanship, Utah
 K29HY-D in Strong City, Oklahoma
 K29HZ-D in Woodward, etc., Oklahoma
 K29IA-D in Centralia, etc., Washington
 K29IB-D in Grays River, etc., Washington
 K29ID-D in Weeksville, Montana
 K29IE-D in St. James, Minnesota
 K29IF-D in Frost, Minnesota
 K29IG-D in Sunlight Basin, Wyoming
 K29IH-D in Meeteetse, etc., Wyoming
 K29II-D in Park City, Utah
 K29IM-D in Samak, Utah
 K29IN-D in Coalville and adjacent area, Utah
 K29IS-D in Round Mountain, Nevada
 K29IT-D in Gateview, Colorado
 K29IU-D in Parlin, Colorado
 K29IV-D in Fremont, Utah
 K29IW-D in Clear Creek, Utah
 K29IX-D in Caineville, Utah
 K29IY-D in Ferron, Utah
 K29IZ-D in Huntington, Utah
 K29JA-D in Alton, Utah
 K29JL-D in Las Animas, Colorado
 K29JN-D in Gold Beach, Oregon
 K29JO-D in Douglas, Wyoming
 K29JQ-D in Fishlake Resort, Utah
 K29JT-D in Butte, Montana
 K29JU-D in Garden City, Kansas
 K29KD-D in Delta, Utah
 K29KE-D in Big Falls, Minnesota
 K29KG-D in Idaho Falls, Idaho
 K29KJ-D in Orovada, Nevada
 K29KR-D in Camas Valley, Oregon
 K29KT-D in Thoreau, New Mexico
 K29KU-D in Bend, Oregon
 K29KY-D in Blackfoot, Idaho
 K29LB-D in Vernal, etc., Utah
 K29LC-D in Truth or Consequences, New Mexico
 K29LG-D in Soda Springs, Idaho
 K29LJ-D in Altus, Oklahoma
 K29LL-D in Phoenix/Talent, Oregon
 K29LM-D in Cottonwood, etc., Arizona
 K29LN-D in Santa Rosa, New Mexico
 K29LO-D in Kingman, Arizona
 K29LQ-D in Polson, Montana
 K29LR-D in Baton Rouge, Louisiana
 K29LS-D in Calexico, California
 K29LV-D in Jackson, Minnesota
 K29LW-D in Rockaway Beach, Oregon
 K29LX-D in Hanksville, Utah
 K29LY-D in Salmon, Idaho
 K29LZ-D in Fountain Green, Utah
 K29MA-D in Boulder, Utah
 K29MC-D in Heber City, Utah
 K29MD-D in O'Neill, Nebraska
 K29ME-D in Antonito, Colorado
 K29MF-D in Peoa and Oakley, Utah
 K29MG-D in Hawthorne, Nevada
 K29MI-D in Parowan, Enoch, etc., Utah
 K29MJ-D in Rockville, Utah
 K29MK-D in Deming, New Mexico
 K29ML-D in Kanarraville/New Harmony, Utah
 K29MN-D in Fillmore, etc., Utah
 K29MP-D in Garrison, Utah
 K29MR-D in Emery, Utah
 K29MS-D in Green River, Utah
 K29MT-D in Scofield, Utah
 K29MV-D in Spring Glen, Utah
 K29MW-D in Duchesne, Utah
 K29MX-D in Manila, etc, Utah
 K29MY-D in Randolph, Utah
 K29MZ-D in Clarendon, Texas
 K29NB-D in Cascade, Idaho
 K29NC-D in Monroe, Louisiana
 K29ND-D in Hot Springs, Montana
 K29NF-D in Anton, Colorado
 K29NG-D in Crested Butte, Colorado
 K29NH-D in Lund & Preston, Nevada
 K29NI-D in Cave Junction, Oregon
 K29NK-D in Eureka, Nevada
 K29NL-D in Wichita, Kansas
 K29NM-D in Spokane, Washington
 K29NN-D in Lucerne Valley, California
 K29NO-D in The Dalles, Oregon
 K29NW-D in Midland, Texas
 K29NX-D in Alexandria, Louisiana
 K29NY-D in Alexandria, Minnesota
 K29OC-D in Chapman, Kansas
 K29OE-D in Racine, Minnesota
 K29OF-D in Deadwood, South Dakota
 K29OH-D in Victoria, Texas
 K44JU-D in Antimony, Utah
 K46HL-D in Susanville, etc., California
 K48GQ-D in Redwood Falls, Minnesota
 KBFX-CD in Bakersfield, California
 KBJE-LD in Tyler, Texas
 KBWF-LD in Sioux City, Iowa
 KCYU-LD in Yakima, Washington
 KDBZ-CD in Bozeman, Montana
 KECA-LD in Eureka, California
 KEHO-LD in Houston, Texas
 KFXL-LD in Lufkin, Texas
 KHDS-LD in Salina, Kansas
 KHPX-CD in Georgetown, Texas
 KIWB-LD in Boise, Idaho
 KJLN-LD in Joplin, Missouri
 KJYY-LD in Portland, Oregon
 KMSG-LD in Fresno, California
 KNKC-LD in Lubbock, Texas
 KOPB-TV (DRT) in Newberg, Oregon
 KPCE-LD in Tucson, Arizona
 KPLO-TV in Pierre, South Dakota
 KPSE-LD in Palm Springs, California
 KPTD-LP in Paris, Texas, uses KDTN's full-power spectrum
 KQMM-CD in Santa Maria, California
 KSAS-LP in Dodge City, Kansas
 KSFZ-LD in Springfield, Missouri
 KTLO-LD in Colorado Springs, Colorado
 KTZT-CD in Tulsa, Oklahoma
 KWMO-LD in Hot Springs, Arkansas
 KWNB-LD in McCook, Nebraska
 W29CI-D in Salem, Illinois
 W29CW-D in Duck Key, Florida
 W29DE-D in Hayesville, North Carolina
 W29DH-D in Moorefield, West Virginia
 W29DM-D in Lewisburg, Tennessee
 W29DN-D in Athens, Georgia
 W29DP-D in Welch, West Virginia
 W29EE-D in San Lorenzo, Puerto Rico
 W29EJ-D in Parkersburg, West Virginia
 W29EN-D in Soperton, Georgia
 W29ES-D in Jacksonville, Illinois
 W29ET-D in Coloma, Wisconsin
 W29EU-D in Clarks Summit, etc., Pennsylvania
 W29EV-D in Hackettstown, New Jersey
 W29EW-D in Willsboro, New York
 W29EY-D in Columbia, Mississippi
 W29EZ-D in Elmira, New York
 W29FD-D in Columbus, Georgia
 W29FE-D in Bat Cave, etc., North Carolina
 W29FF-D in Atlantic City, New Jersey
 W29FJ-D in Dothan, Alabama
 W29FK-D in Clarksburg, West Virginia
 W29FQ-D in Pottsville, Pennsylvania
 W29FR-D in Lebanon-Nashville, Tennessee
 WAMS-LD in Minster-New Bremen, Ohio
 WAUR-LD in Aurora, Illinois
 WAZS-LD in North Charleston, South Carolina
 WBGT-CD in Rochester, New York
 WCYB-TV in Bristol, Virginia
 WDOX-LD in Palm Beach, Florida
 WDZC-LD in Augusta, Georgia
 WELL-LD in Philadelphia, Pennsylvania
 WFET-LD in Lewisburg, Tennessee
 WFYI-LD in Indianapolis, Indiana
 WIIW-LD in Nashville, Tennessee
 WJAC-TV in Bedford, Pennsylvania
 WJDO-LD in Macon, Georgia
 WJYL-CD in Jeffersonville, Indiana
 WKIZ-LD in Key West, Florida
 WLEH-LD in St. Louis, Illinois
 WLNM-LD in Lansing, Michigan
 WMVJ-CD in Melbourne, Florida
 WNCB-LD in Fayetteville, North Carolina
 WNYD-LD in New York, New York
 WOMS-CD in Muskegon, Michigan
 WOOH-LD in Zanesville, Ohio
 WPXU-LD in Amityville, New York
 WQMK-LD in Cusseta, Alabama
 WQXT-CD in St. Augustine, Florida
 WSQY-LD in Spartanburg, South Carolina
 WSWF-LD in Orlando, Florida
 WTXX-LD in New Haven, Connecticut
 WUHQ-LD in Grand Rapids, Michigan
 WURH-CD in Miami, Florida, uses WPBT's full-power spectrum
 WVTN-LD in Corbin, Kentucky
 WWAT-CD in Charleroi, Pennsylvania
 WXON-LD in Flint, Michigan
 WYGA-CD in Atlanta, Georgia

The following low-power stations, which are no longer licensed, formerly broadcast on digital or analog channel 29:
 K29AA-D in Kalispell/Whitefish, Montana
 K29BH-D in Wellington, Texas
 K29BR-D in Canadian, Texas
 K29CI in Prineville, etc., Oregon
 K29CJ in Eureka, Utah
 K29DF in Ukiah, California
 K29DK in Williams, Arizona
 K29DP in Lordsburg, New Mexico
 K29EC in Blythe, California
 K29EP in Morgan, etc., Utah
 K29EZ in Fruitland, etc., Utah
 K29FF in Kennewick, etc., Washington
 K29GD in Amarillo, Texas
 K29GL in Lincoln, Nebraska
 K29GM in Duckwater, etc., Nevada
 K29HA in Malad City, Idaho
 K29JB-D in Moses Lake, Washington
 K29JD-D in Redding, California
 K29JF-D in Rolla, Missouri
 K29JM in Elko, Nevada
 K29JW-D in Granite Falls, Minnesota
 K29KH-D in Kasilof, Alaska
 K29MM-D in Billings, Montana
 K29MU-D in Coos Bay, Oregon
 KAPT-LP in Alamogordo, New Mexico
 KBKV-LD in Columbia, Missouri
 KREN-LP in Susanville, California
 KSDX-LP in San Diego, California
 KSWY-LP in Sheridan, Wyoming
 KVKV-LP in Victorville, California
 W29CA in Brunswick, Maine
 W29CB in St. Thomas, U.S. Virgin Islands
 W29DT-D in Tuscaloosa, Alabama
 WAOH-CD in Akron, Ohio
 WBOA-CD in Kittanning, Pennsylvania
 WEHG-LD in Wausau, Wisconsin
 WEYS-LD in Miami, Florida
 WHVL-LP in State College, etc., Pennsylvania
 WMUR-LP in Littleton, New Hampshire

References

29 low-power